Heinrich Kroll (1894-1946) was a German First World War fighter ace credited with 33 confirmed aerial victories. He shot down his first five opponents while flying combat for the fighter squadron Jagdstaffel 9, beginning in November 1916. On 1 July 1917 he was transferred to command Jagdstaffel 24. By the time a severe wounding removed him from flight duty on 14 August 1918, he had scored an additional 28 victories.

List of victories

Victories are reported in chronological order, which is not necessarily the dates the victories were confirmed by headquarters.

This list is complete for entries, though obviously not for all details. Background data was abstracted from Above the Lines: The Aces and Fighter Units of the German Air Service, Naval Air Service and Flanders Marine Corps, 1914–1918, pp. 150–151, and The Aerodrome webpage on Heinrich Kroll . Abbreviations were expanded by the editor creating this list.

References

Aerial victories of Kroll, Heinrich
Kroll, Heinrich